Glogov Brod is a village south of Artiče in the Municipality of Brežice in eastern Slovenia. The area is part of the traditional region of Styria. It is now included in the Lower Sava Statistical Region.

References

External links
Glogov Brod on Geopedia

Populated places in the Municipality of Brežice